Hong Kong Syndikat (also Hongkong Syndikat) was a German synthpop music group of the eighties.

History 
Hong Kong Syndikat formed at the beginning of the Eighties after decorator and disc-jockey Bruno Grünberg, graphics designer Hartmut Möller and Gerd Plez, all from Bremen, hat met in West Berlin. They were signed to a record contract, and in 1982 they released their debut album, Erster Streich.

The first single, Berlin Bleibt Doch Berlin, contained quotes from then US President Ronald Reagan. This first album was still recorded mainly in German; subsequent releases would see them switch to English for commercial reasons.

This move eventually was met with acclaim: by 1984 Hong Kong Syndikat had performed their first live concert in New York City; later the same year they recorded their second album, Olympia, in London -- produced by Rusty Egan, a member of Visage. This album, like the others, had Curt Cress sit in on drums.

Their short-lived success came in 1985 with their third album, Never Too Much, from which three singles were released: Too Much, Concrete & Clay and Girls I Love, the first two of which became Top 30 pop singles in Germany.

Hong Kong Syndikat were not able to repeat or expand on this: when the 4th album Des Teutons Pas Nippons (1987) turned out to become a commercial flop, the act disbanded in 1989. Gerd Plez would eventually re-appear as a songwriter for Austrian pop singer Falco.

Members 
 Bruno Grünberg jr. (* 04/01/1956) (voice, synth)
 Gerd Plez (* 10/04/1956) (voice, synth)
 Hartmut Möller (* 05/09/1952) (guitar)

Discography

Singles/Maxi 
 Sugarcane
 Unusual
 1982 · Berlin Bleibt Doch Berlin (album Erster Streich)
 1984 · Berlin (album Olympia)
 1984 · Samba Olec (album Olympia)
 1985 · Too Much (album Never Too Much)
 1986 · That's Jungle / Loosin' Winnin''' (album Never Too Much)
 1986 · Concrete & Clay (album Never Too Much)
 1986 · Girls I Love (album Never Too Much)
 1987 · No More Sorrow (album Des Teutons Pas Nippons)
 1989 · Real Men Don't Eat Gummibears (album Des Teutons Pas Nippons)
 1999 · Too Much '99 (album Des Teutons Pas Nippons)

 Albums 
 1982 · Erster Streich 1984 · Olympia 1985 · Never Too Much 1987 · Des Teutons Pas Nippons Further reading 
 Graf, Christian: Das NDW Lexikon. Die Neue Deutsche Welle - Bands und Solisten von A bis Z''. Schwarzkopf & Schwarzkopf, Berlin 2003, .

External links 
 http://www.discogs.com/artist/40918-Hongkong-Syndikat|Hong Kong Syndikat on discogs.com

German electronic music groups
German dance music groups